Impulse Music Travel is an entertainment retail chain in the United Kingdom, with 24 concessions in various UK airports and railway stations. The company was formed in March 1994. In July 2007, Managing Director Les Whitfield sold the company.

History 
The company was formed in March 1994 and entered into administration on 21 March 2001 with BDO Stoy Hayward. Ray Stocking, joint administrator of Impulse Music Travel, said the rapid expansion of the chain was one of the reasons why it had forced the company into administration. The company was brought out of administration and sold in July 2007. There are currently 24 Impulse locations across the United Kingdom.

Operations 
In the 1990s, the company operated the Selfridges, in London, and Fenwicks, in Newcastle, computer departments. Other store locations previously included Burnley, Darlington, Hartlepool and Macclesfield, and King's Cross and Marylebone railway stations.

The original concessions and retail outlets were designed by Mark Homer Design - www.markhomerdesign.co.uk

Today, Impulse operates concessions at Birmingham Airport, London Luton Airport, Manchester Airport formed through contracts with BAA.

Product range 
Impulse Music Travel concessions mainly stock CDs, DVDs and Video Games.

See also 
 Head Entertainment

References 

Retail companies of the United Kingdom
Retail companies established in 1994